CCIT may refer to:

 California Center for Innovative Transportation, University of California, Berkeley
 Center for Constitutional Issues in Technology, a suborganization of Foresight Institute
 Chief Commissioner of Income Tax Central (CCIT-C), a revenue enforcement agency in India
 Chin Christian Institute of Theology, in Falam, Chin State, Myanmar
 Comprehensive Convention on International Terrorism, a proposed treaty to criminalize international terrorism
 ), renamed ITU-T in 1993
 Research Center for Communication and Information Technology, a project of the King Mongkut's Institute of Technology Ladkrabang